Wings of Love is the third album by the Italian progressive/jazz rock group Nova, that was released by Arista Records in 1977.

Track listing

Personnel
Elio D'Anna - soprano, tenor, alto and baritone saxophones, flutes
Corrado Rustici - lead guitar, 6- and 12-string acoustic guitars, glockenspiel, triangle, gong, lead vocals
Renato Rosset - Fender Rhodes piano, acoustic piano, mini moog, poly moog, clavinet, Hammond organ
Barry Johnson - bass guitar, wind chimes, lead vocals on "Inner Star" and "You are Light"
Ric Parnell - drums, percussion
Nectar Smile Choir - backing vocals

References

External links
 

1977 albums
Nova (Italian band) albums
Arista Records albums
Albums produced by Narada Michael Walden
albums recorded at Trident Studios